St. John's International School can refer to:
St. John's International School (Belgium)
St. John's International School (Malaysia)
St. John's International School (Thailand)